Ramzan Khan, popularly known as Munna Master, is an Indian singer and social worker who sings Bhajans (devotional songs) and takes care of cows. He hails from Jaipur district of Rajasthan. He was conferred with Padma Shri,  the fourth highest civilian award in India in 2020 for his contribution to arts.

Life
Khan came to limelight for his dedication to cows and Krishna-bhakti after a controversy erupted over the appointment of his son, Feroze Khan as an assistant professor at Banaras Hindu University's Sanskrit Vidya Dharma Vigyan Department in November 2019. He holds a degree of Shashtri in the Sanskrit language. He has authored a book, Shri Shyam Surabhi Vandana.

Awards and recognition 
 Padma Shri, 2020

See also 
 List of Padma Shri award recipients (2020-2029)

References

Living people
People from Uttar Pradesh
Recipients of the Padma Shri
Recipients of the Padma Shri in arts
Year of birth missing (living people)